Boiling Pot is a 2015 American drama film directed by Omar Ashmawey and starring Louis Gossett Jr., Danielle Fishel, and Keith David.

Premise
On an American college campus, ideas that have been long neglected emerge as racial tension grows between different student groups.

Cast
 Louis Gossett Jr. as Detective Haven
 Danielle Fishel as Valerie Davis
 Keith David as Agent Long
 M. Emmet Walsh as Dean Marrison
 Davetta Sherwood as Rose Torrance
 John Heard as Tom Davis
 Ibrahim Ashmawey as Hazem Seif 
 Ashley Lynn Switzer as Claire Davis 
 Sayed Badreya as Anwar Seif
 Corrin Evans as Lauren Davis
 Kasey St. John as Kasey

References

External links

2015 drama films
American drama films
American independent films
Films about race and ethnicity
2015 films
2015 independent films
2010s English-language films
2010s American films